Ynakhsyt (Inaxsıt) is a rural locality (a selo), the only inhabited locality, and the administrative center of Kangalassky Rural Okrug of Nyurbinsky District in the Sakha Republic, Russia, located  from Nyurba, the administrative center of the district. Its population as of the 2010 Census was 608, of whom 289 were male and 319 female, up from 606 as recorded during the 2002 Census.

References

Notes

Sources
Official website of the Sakha Republic. Registry of the Administrative-Territorial Divisions of the Sakha Republic. Nyurbinsky District. 

Rural localities in Nyurbinsky District